Reinhard Fabisch (19 August 1950 – 12 July 2008) was a German football manager and player. He coached teams in Qatar, Malta, Tunisia, Nepal, Oman, United Arab Emirates, and Zimbabwe and the national teams of Zimbabwe, Kenya, and Benin.

Playing career
As a player Fabisch was signed to Borussia Dortmund between 1969 and 1971 although he did not play for the senior team.

Coaching career
Fabisch commenced coaching in as an assistant with Tennis Borussia Berlin and SG Union Solingen.

Fabisch had three stints as coach of the Kenya national team. In 1987, he managed Harambee Stars to the runners up position against Egypt at the Fourth All-Africa Games, in 1997 he took charge during the qualification tournament for the 1998 World Cup. He was signed to replace Christian Chukwu in 2001, and during the CECAFA Cup he led Kenya to the finals, eventually losing to Ethiopia. He was dismissed in June 2002. 

He previously managed the national team of Zimbabwe, as well as Emirates Club in the UAE. He became manager of the Benin national team in December 2007. He was embroiled in a controversy over match-fixing, after claiming he was asked for fix a result. He left the position in May 2008.

Death
Reinhard Fabisch died of cancer in Germany on 12 July 2008.

References

1950 births
2008 deaths
People from Schwerte
Sportspeople from Arnsberg (region)
German football managers
Borussia Dortmund players
Kenya national football team managers
Zimbabwe national football team managers
Benin national football team managers
Mamelodi Sundowns F.C. managers
Sportspeople involved in betting scandals
Deaths from cancer in Germany
German expatriate sportspeople in South Africa
German expatriate football managers
Expatriate football managers in Kenya
Expatriate football managers in Zimbabwe
Expatriate football managers in Benin
Expatriate football managers in the United Arab Emirates
Expatriate soccer managers in South Africa
2008 Africa Cup of Nations managers
Emirates Club managers
German footballers
Association football forwards
Footballers from North Rhine-Westphalia
German expatriate sportspeople in Benin
German expatriate sportspeople in Kenya
German expatriate sportspeople in Zimbabwe
German expatriate sportspeople in the United Arab Emirates